Siderone galanthis, the scarlet leafwing or red-striped leafwing, is a species of butterfly of the family Nymphalidae. It is found from Mexico to southern Brazil. The habitat consists deciduous and evergreen forests at altitudes up to 900 meters.

Adults have been recorded imbibing mineralised moisture from the ground.

The larvae have been recorded feeding on Casearia sylvestris and Zuelania quidonia.

Subspecies
Siderone galanthis galanthis (Surinam, Brazil: Pará, Trinidad)
Siderone galanthis thebais C. & R. Felder, 1862 (Colombia, Ecuador, Brazil: Amazonas)

References

Anaeini
Butterflies of North America
Butterflies of Central America
Butterflies of the Caribbean
Nymphalidae of South America
Butterflies of Cuba
Lepidoptera of Brazil
Lepidoptera of Venezuela
Butterflies described in 1775
Taxa named by Pieter Cramer